Molotychi is a rural locality and the administrative center of Molotychevsky Selsoviet Rural Settlement, Fatezhsky District, Kursk Oblast, Russia. The population as of 2010 is 442.

Geography 
The village is located on the Molotychi Brook (a left tributary of the Svapa River), 115 km from the Russia–Ukraine border, 58 km north-west of Kursk, 18 km north-east of the district center – the town Fatezh.

Climate
Molotychi has a warm-summer humid continental climate (Dfb in the Köppen climate classification).

Transport 
Molotychi is located 8 km from the federal route  Crimea Highway as part of the European route E105, 1.5 km from the road of regional importance  (Verkhny Lyubazh – Ponyri), on the road of intermunicipal significance  (38K-002 – Molotychi), 18.5 km from the nearest railway halt 474 km (railway line Oryol – Kursk).

The rural locality is situated 58 km from Kursk Vostochny Airport, 182 km from Belgorod International Airport and 228 km from Voronezh Peter the Great Airport.

References

Notes

Sources

Rural localities in Fatezhsky District
Fatezhsky Uyezd